Divine intervention is an event that occurs when a deity (i.e. God or a god) becomes actively involved in changing some situation in human affairs.

Divine Intervention may also refer to:

Music
Divine Intervention (Slayer album), a 1994 album by American band, Slayer
Divine Intervention Tour, a 2015 tour by recording artist Bette Midler
Divine Intervention (Client Liaison album), a 2021 album by Australian duo Client Liaison
"Divine Intervention Part 3", a 2002 song by Australian musician Suffa
"Divine Intervention", a song by Matthew Sweet on the 1991 album Girlfriend
"Divine Intervention", a song by Pennywise on the 2001 album Land of the Free?
"Divine Intervention", a song by Backstreet Boys recorded for the 2005 album Never Gone, but it didn't make the cut
"Divine Intervention", a song by Taking Back Sunday from the 2006 album Louder Now
"Divine Intervention", a song by Autopilot Off from the 2004 album Make a Sound

Other uses
Divine Intervention (2002 film), a film by Elia Suleiman
Divine Intervention (2007 film), an American romantic comedy-drama film
Divine/Intervention, a 2015 play about performer Divine

See also
Act of God, a legal term for natural events that can't be blamed on any person
Divine providence
Divine retribution